Jacques Brel Is Alive and Well and Living in Paris is a 1975 French/Canadian musical film directed by Denis Héroux. The screenplay by Eric Blau is an adaptation of his book for the long-running off-Broadway revue of the same name. The score is composed of songs with music by Jacques Brel and his accompanist Gérard Jouannest and English translations of the original French lyrics by Blau and Mort Shuman.

Jacques Brel Is Alive and Well and Living in Paris was produced and released by the American Film Theatre, which adapted theatrical works for a subscription-driven cinema series. It was the second of two musical films created by the American Film Theatre, following Lost in the Stars in 1974.

Plot
The film opens in a puppet theater, where three audience members—a military officer, a taxi driver, and a woman on a shopping trip—discover they are being depicted as marionette caricatures against a backdrop of newsreel footage from the 1920s through the 1950s. They find themselves trapped backstage amidst bizarre circumstances ... the puppet master is found dead above the stage, a gigantic plaster hand drops from the ceiling to the floor, and a deafening siren blares endlessly. The trio escapes from the theater to a beach, where the military officer locates the siren and kicks it, causing it to blow up. 
 
The film then resumes the stage show's plotless structure. In this version, different cinematic interpretations are used to illustrate the show's score. A straightforward approach is for some songs: "Bachelor's Dance" finds a bartender singing out loud of his potential mate while eyeing the female patrons of his establishment, while "Amsterdam" places a weary inebriate in a barroom corner while he watches the mix of sailors and sexual predators pass by his table. Other songs are interpreted in a surreal manner: with "Marieke," images of a large red ball bouncing off a cliff are mixed with that of Elly Stone, dressed in a suit and tie, pursuing a little girl amidst the headstones of a cemetery.

Cast

Production
The original Off-Broadway revue was a series of 25 songs performed by two men and two women. For the film version, screenwriter Blau and director Heroux reconfigured the presentation. One of the women was dropped from the cast line-up, and a chorus consisting of young hippies and eccentric-looking characters was added.

Mort Shuman and Elly Stone were members of the original off-Broadway cast, while Joe Masiell was a replacement later in the run. These were the only film performances of Stone and Masiell, whose respective careers focused on theatre and cabaret performances. Jacques Brel, who had no part in the original stage production, was recruited for a guest appearance.

François Rauber served as the film's music director and orchestrated and conducted the score. The order of the songs was rearranged, and the original overture was cut, replaced with the song "Madeleine" performed during the title sequence by off-camera singers. Three songs from the original revue were also cut: "The Girls And The Dogs (Les filles et les chiens)," "Fanette (La Fanette)," and "You're Not Alone (Jef)." Five new songs were added in their place: "The Taxi Cab (Le gaz)," "My Childhood (Mon enfance)," "Last Supper (Le dernier repas)," "Song for Old Lovers (La chanson des vieux amants)," and "Ne me quitte pas." The latter song was performed by Brel in French without English subtitles (there was already a popular English-language translation by Rod McKuen).

Interiors were filmed at the Victorine Studios in Nice.

Soundtrack
Jacques Brel is Alive and Well and Living in Paris has no dialogue; the entire film is sung.

"Madeleine" – Performed off-camera by Françoise Simon, Joseph Neil, Annette Perrone, Judy Lander and Shawn Elliott (who was a member of the original off-Broadway cast)
"Marathon" ("Les flamandes") – Mort Shuman, Elly Stone, and Joe Masiell
"My Childhood" ("Mon enfance") – Elly Stone
"The Statue" – Joe Masiell
"Brussels" ("Bruxelles") – Mort Shuman, Elly Stone, and Joe Masiell
"Jackie" ("La chanson de Jacky") – Mort Shuman
"Timid Frieda" ("Les timides") – Elly Stone
"Taxicab" ("Le gaz") – Mort Shuman
"The Old Folks" ("Les Vieux") – Elly Stone
"Alone" ("Seul") – Joe Masiell
"I Loved" ("J'aimais") – Elly Stone
"Funeral Tango" ("Le tango funèbre") – Mort Shuman
"Bachelor's Dance" ("La bourrée du célibataire") – Joe Masiell
"Amsterdam" – Mort Shuman
"Ne Me Quitte Pas" – Jacques Brel
"Desperate Ones" ("Les désespérés") – Mort Shuman, Elly Stone, and Joe Masiell
"Sons of..." ("Fils de...") – Elly Stone
"The Bulls" ("Les taureaux") – Joe Masiell
"Marieke" – Elly Stone (performed in English and Flemish)
"Last Supper" ("Le Dernier Repas") – Mort Shuman, Elly Stone, and Joe Masiell
"Mathilde" – Mort Shuman
"The Middle Class" ("Les bourgeois") – Mort Shuman and Joe Masiell
"Song of Old Lovers" ("La chanson des vieux amants") – Elly Stone
"Next" ("Au suivant") – Joe Masiell
"Carousel" ("La valse à mille temps") – Elly Stone
"If Only We Have Love" ("Quand on n'a que l'amour") – Mort Shuman, Elly Stone, and Joe Masiell.

Reception
The film did not receive a strong reaction from the critics at the time of its release.  In his review in The New York Times, Vincent Canby said, "Mr. Heroux, with the obvious cooperation of Eric Blau and Mort Shuman . . . has transformed what was essentially a concert into an extravaganza of surreal images that keep messing things up. The images are vivid and disconnected to one another (good) but they inevitably wind up being visual translations of the lyrics (bad). It's a rather classy variation on the format employed by the old Hit Parade television show, though it's seldom as witty."

Three decades later, when the film was released in the U.S. on DVD by Kino on Video, reaction was still negative. Glenn Erickson of DVD Talk wrote, "As interpreted here, the revue format has the same pacing problems that a stack of music videos would have if there were not enough variety. Many of the songs are amusing or emotional, but after a while too many seem similar - a plaintive half-melody that slowly rises in intensity and volume, until the singer is practically screaming. The elaborate scene changes don't help the fact that we're not seeing live performances - the frantic singers are mouthing to playback, which robs the material of its stage immediacy."

Writing in The Boston Globe, Ed Siegel called the film "the biggest dud of all" in the American Film Theatre series and added, "As directed by Denis Heroux, Brel looks like an amateurish version of Hair."

References

External links

Jacques Brel Is Alive and Well and Living in Paris at Rotten Tomatoes

1975 films
1975 LGBT-related films
Canadian LGBT-related films
Films based on musicals
English-language Canadian films
1970s English-language films
English-language French films
1970s French-language films
1970s musical films
Films directed by Denis Héroux
Canadian musical films
Sung-through musical films
Jacques Brel
Cultural depictions of Jacques Brel
French LGBT-related films
French musical films
1970s Canadian films
1970s French films